24th Rhythmic Gymnastics European Championships were held in Torino, Italy from 5 June to 7 June 2008.

Medal winners

Senior Results

Individual all-around

Group all-around

Group 5 ropes

Group 3 hoops + 2 clubs

Junior Results

Team

Rope

Hoop

Ball

Ribbon

References

FIG official site

Rhythmic Gymnastics European Championships
Rhythmic Gymnastics European Championships
2008 in Italian sport
International gymnastics competitions hosted by Italy